Kieran Michael McAnulty (born 31 January 1985) is a  New Zealand Labour Party politician. First elected to parliament in 2017, he is a Cabinet minister and the Member of Parliament for the Wairarapa electorate. Formerly the Chief Government Whip, McAnulty is now the Minister of Local Government and Minister for Emergency Management, among other portfolios.

Personal life
McAnulty was born in Eketāhuna. McAnulty's family have lived in the Wairarapa area for  more than 170 years, with his great grandmother's great grandfather, Henry Burling arriving as an early settler in what is now the town of Featherston. McAnulty completed a thesis at the University of Otago in 2011 titled The role of political positioning in party performance in the 2008 New Zealand General Election. He has previously worked for the T.A.B. as a bookmaker covering the racing industry and an economic development advisor for the Masterton District Council. He is a volunteer firefighter, board member of both Wings over Wairarapa and Golden Shears, a trustee of the Masterton Community Trust and Chair of Relay For Life. In September 2016 McAnulty wrestled a car thief who was trying to steal his ute to the ground in Masterton.

Political career
He had previously been offered the Wairarapa candidacy in 2011, but declined.

Member of Parliament

He instead entered Parliament via the party list, where he was ranked 38.

In November 2017 he was appointed Labour's junior whip.

On 25 September 2019, McAnulty was ejected from Parliament by the Speaker of the House Trevor Mallard for making disparaging remarks about National Party leader Simon Bridges during a Parliamentary debate about Prime Minister Jacinda Ardern's meeting with US President Donald Trump. Mallard also ejected New Zealand First MP Shane Jones for similar disruptive behaviour.

In the 2020 New Zealand general election, McAnulty contested the Wairarapa electorate for Labour, taking it by a margin of 6,545 votes. On 2 November 2020, following the election, the Labour caucus elected McAnulty as its chief whip.

In a June 2022 reshuffle, McAnulty was appointed as Minister for Racing, Minister for Emergency Management and associate Minister of Local Government and of Transport by Ardern. McAnulty's role as Minister for Racing gives him responsibility for the running of the Totalisator Agency Board, which he worked for before entering politics.

In August 2022, McAnulty was implicated in bullying accusations by fellow Labour MP Gaurav Sharma. Sharma accused McAnulty  of "gaslighting me, shouting at me, degrading me in front of caucus members and other attendees at events and telling me that I was a terrible MP". The Labour Party, including Ardern, rejected the claims.

Following a cabinet reshuffle that occurred on 31 January 2023, McAnulty succeeded Nanaia Mahuta as Minister of Local Government. Prime Minister Chris Hipkins also confirmed that the Three Waters reform programme (which falls under the Local Government portfolio) would continue.

On 14 February 2023, McAnulty in his capacity as Emergency Management Minister declared a national state of emergency over the Northland, Auckland, Tairawhiti, Bay of Plenty, Waikato and Hawke's Bay regions in response to Cyclone Gabrielle. This marked the third time a state of emergency had been declared over the country.

Political views 
McAnulty identifies as a socialist and supports a New Zealand republic, with a local head of state. McAnulty was previously treasurer of the New Zealand Republic campaign before entering parliament.

McAnulty, despite the profession of his Catholic faith, is in favour of more open abortion laws. He stated in Parliament "I was raised that my religious views are mine only. So I will not use my vote today to impose any particular view that I may have to prevent the choice of a woman to make on her own body."

McAnulty is in favour of decriminalising cannabis, and has admitted to smoking cannabis twice.

References

External links
 

|-

|-

|-

New Zealand socialists
Living people
1985 births
People educated at Chanel College, Masterton
New Zealand Labour Party MPs
Members of the New Zealand House of Representatives
New Zealand list MPs
Unsuccessful candidates in the 2014 New Zealand general election
Candidates in the 2020 New Zealand general election
New Zealand firefighters
University of Otago alumni
Members of the Cabinet of New Zealand
People from Eketāhuna